Too Long in Exile is the twenty-second studio album by Northern Irish singer-songwriter Van Morrison. The album was produced by Morrison and draws on urban blues and soul jazz sounds, including collaborations with John Lee Hooker and Georgie Fame. Released in 1993 by Polydor Records, Too Long in Exile received positive reviews from most critics and reached #4 on the UK Albums Chart. It reached #29 in the US, Van Morrison's highest ranking since 1978's Wavelength (#28) and until 1999's Back on Top (#28).

Critical reception

Too Long in Exile received generally positive reviews. Rock critic Peter Paphides wrote in Melody Maker at the time, "never has one man's regression therapy sounded this exhilarating", while Gavin Martin from the Daily Mirror remarked that Morrison has "rediscovered his 'earthy, elemental fire'. He is still the foremost blues auteur." Chicago Tribune critic Greg Kot found his singing "freer than ever" and most of the performances "joyful", praising the music's urban blues and soul-jazz sounds. Kot said the album is a "casual tour de force", with the exception of the cover song "Moody's Mood for Love", which he felt would nevertheless be enjoyed by fans of Morrison's "Moondance" (1970). In The Village Voice, Robert Christgau said Morrison draws on the spiritual guidance of blues greats for the album's best material, highlighting the collaborations with John Lee Hooker on "Gloria" and "Wasted Years", although he lamented some aimless songs such as "In the Forest".

In The Rolling Stone Album Guide (2004), Rob Sheffield said Too Long in Exile was the "breeziest" of Morrison's post-1980s albums. In a less enthusiastic review, AllMusic's Bil Carpenter wrote in retrospect that it was "an earthly departure from his previous two pop efforts", featuring a "delicious" cover of "Lonely Avenue" and impressive duets with Hooker but also a "mundane" title track. Rolling Stone included the album in its list of the "Essential Recordings of the 90's".

Track listing
All songs written by Van Morrison except as indicated.
 "Too Long in Exile" – 6:18
 "Big Time Operators" – 6:03
 "Lonely Avenue/You Give Me Nothing but the Blues" (Doc Pomus, Morrison) – 6:24
 "Ball & Chain" – 5:36
 "In the Forest" – 4:38
 "Till We Get the Healing Done" – 8:29
 "Gloria"  – 5:19
 "Good Morning Little Schoolgirl" (Sonny Boy Williamson) – 4:07
 "Wasted Years" – 3:57
 "The Lonesome Road" (Nathaniel Shilkret, Gene Austin) – 3:16
 "Moody's Mood for Love" (James Moody, Dorothy Fields, Jimmy McHugh) – 2:52
 "Close Enough for Jazz" – 2:39
 "Before the World Was Made" (text by William Butler Yeats, adapted by Morrison, music by Kenny Craddock) – 4:24
 "I'll Take Care of You" (Brook Benton) – 5:19
 "Instrumental/Tell Me What You Want" – 8:08

Personnel
Van Morrison – vocals, electric guitar, acoustic guitar, alto saxophone, harmonica
John Lee Hooker – vocals and electric guitar on "Gloria" and "Wasted Years"
Georgie Fame – Hammond organ, backing vocals
Ronnie Johnson – electric guitar
Nicky Scott – bass guitar
Candy Dulfer – alto saxophone
Kate St John – tenor saxophone, English Horn
Teena Lyle – backing vocals, Hammond organ, percussion, vibraphone
Jonn Savannah – backing vocals, Hammond organ
Geoff Dunn – drums
Howard Francis – Hammond organ, piano
Paul Robinson – drums
John Allair – Hammond organ
Richard Cousins – bass guitar
Kevin Hayes – drums

Charts

Weekly charts

Year-end charts

Certifications

References

Bibliography
Hinton, Brian (1997). Celtic Crossroads: The Art of Van Morrison, Sanctuary,

External links 
 

Van Morrison albums
1993 albums
Mercury Records albums